Sharak may refer to:
 Sharak, Bushehr (شرك - Sharak)
 Sharak, Sistan and Baluchestan (شارك - Shārak)
 Sharak, Zanjan (شرك - Sharak)